Jim Button may refer to:

Computer programmer Jim Knopf
The main character in Michael Ende's Jim Button novels:
Jim Button and Luke the Engine Driver
Jim Button and the Wild 13